Martin Matějíček (born September 4, 1991) is a Czech professional ice hockey defenceman. He is currently playing for Aigles de Nice of the Ligue Magnus.

Matějíček previously played with HC Zlín in the Czech Extraliga, playing 275 regular season games and 55 playoff games for the team between 2010 and 2019.

References

External links

1991 births
Living people
Les Aigles de Nice players
Czech ice hockey defencemen
HC Dukla Jihlava players
AZ Havířov players
People from Uherský Brod
HC RT Torax Poruba players
HC ZUBR Přerov players
SK Horácká Slavia Třebíč players
Hokej Šumperk 2003 players
PSG Berani Zlín players
Sportspeople from the Zlín Region
Czech expatriate ice hockey people
Czech expatriate sportspeople in France
Expatriate ice hockey players in France